Sectorul Buiucani is one of the five sectors in Chişinău, the capital of Moldova, and the most affluent. The local administration is managed by a pretor appointed by the city administration. It governs over a portion of the city of Chişinău itself (the northwestern part), the cities/towns of Durleşti and Vatra, and the communes of Condriţa, Ghidighici, and Truşeni. It is largely populated by Romanians (Moldovans).

The largest Jewish cemetery in Moldova is in Buiucani, it was listed as a national monument in 2012. The cemetery hosts an abandoned synagogue that was destroyed by the Nazis during the Holocaust. Buiucani is also home to a large indoor market, on Ion Creangă street which sells clothes and other goods at low prices. On Ion Pelivan street there is a school and a center for refugees from various conflicts. There are also several parks Alunelul, Dendrarium, and Valea Morilor in the area and easy access to the rest of Chisinau, for example, Trolleybus nr. 22 can go to the city center and Botanica.

External links

Sectors of Chișinău